Hugo César Cisneros Rodríguez (born November 27, 1994, in Cuerámaro, Guanajuato) is a Mexican professional footballer who last played for Querétaro F.C. Premier. He made his professional debut with Cimarrones de Sonora during an Ascenso MX defeat to Mineros de Zacatecas on 22 July 2016.

References

External links
 

1994 births
Living people
Mexican footballers
Association football midfielders
Cimarrones de Sonora players
Ascenso MX players
Liga Premier de México players
Tercera División de México players
Footballers from Guanajuato